Forever is a 1978 American made-for-television romantic drama film starring Stephanie Zimbalist and Dean Butler. It is based on the Judy Blume novel Forever... and premiered on CBS on January 6, 1978.

Cast
Stephanie Zimbalist as Katherine Danziger
Dean Butler as Michael Wagner
John Friedrich as Artie Lewin
Beth Raines as Erica
Diana Scarwid as Sybil Davidson

Production
Filming took place at Lake Tahoe and Mill Valley.

References

External links
Forever at IMDb
Forever at BFI
Forever at TCMDB

1978 television films
1978 films
1978 romantic drama films
American romantic drama films
Films based on American novels
Works by Judy Blume
CBS network films
Films directed by John Korty
Films scored by Fred Karlin
1970s English-language films
American drama television films
1970s American films